Cliveden ( or ), also known as the Chew House, is a historic site owned by the National Trust for Historic Preservation, located in the Mount Airy neighborhood of Northwest Philadelphia.  Built as a country house for attorney Benjamin Chew, Cliveden was completed in 1767 and was home to seven generations of the Chew family. Cliveden has long been famous as the site of the American Revolutionary War's Battle of Germantown in 1777 as well as for its Georgian architecture.

New research is unearthing a more complicated history at Cliveden, which involves layers of significance, including the lives of those who were enslaved and in service to the Chew family. That information broadens the meaning of Cliveden as a preserved historic place, exploring themes and stories of American identity and freedom.  Traces of the history of the Cliveden property and its occupants can be found throughout the five acre woody landscape.

The Cliveden grounds are open for the community to enjoy as a public park Monday-Friday, 9am-5pm, weather permitting.  The property includes four buildings, the Main House, Kitchen Dependency, Wash House and Carriage House.  Tours of Cliveden are available May through August, Thursday-Sunday, from 12-4pm and September through November, Friday-Sunday 12-4pm.

Architectural history
Cliveden was built 1763–1767 by local German craftsmen as a summer home for prominent lawyer Benjamin Chew, Sr. (1722–1810) and his family as a respite from heat and yellow fever epidemics.  During the American Revolutionary War, the property was at the center of the Battle of Germantown in 1777.  The house was inhabited by seven generations of the Chew family and their household until 1972, with one exception; when it was sold to Blair McClenachan (1734–1812) after the battle, but repurchased by the Chew family in 1797.  It is important to note that though the Chew family and their households occupied Cliveden until 1970, architectural changes to the house always took into account the original Georgian facade and plan, which remain intact despite significant changes and adaptations seen from the rear.

Born in Tidewater, Maryland, Benjamin Chew migrated to the Delaware Valley with the promise of land investments and an advantageous connection with the Penn family.  Chew trained as a lawyer and became part of a Governor's Council that advised and protected the interests of the Pennsylvania Colony, and was later made Chief Justice of the colony.  This position came with all the privilege expected, including status, wealth and opportunity.  The elite Chew family also owned a town house in the Dock Ward of Philadelphia, a large house in Dover, Delaware and several plantations in Maryland and Delaware, as well as many developed and undeveloped properties, rural and urban.  The Chews’ diverse business interests included import/export shipping, agriculture, iron mining and refining and more.  All of these pursuits were sustained and complicated by the use of enslaved and indentured labor.  During the tumultuous time surrounding the Revolution and nation building, Chew reserved his political position, but regained prominence after the new government was established.

With a design largely derived from architectural patterns brought from the United Kingdom, Cliveden epitomizes the ideals of elite design in the American colonies while simultaneously incorporating regional building materials and practices of the Delaware Valley.  The prospect of Cliveden from the south facade follows the symmetry of Georgian architecture with emphasis on the forms, patterns and ratios of the Classical world. There is no named architect of Cliveden, but the Chew Family Papers, held at the Historical Society of Pennsylvania, include nine original drawings associated with the design process, which are attributed to lawyer and draftsman William Peters (1702–1786), and reference Andrea Palladio (1508–1580) and British architect Abraham Swan (active 1745–68).  Built during a second wave of population growth and construction in Germantown in the 1760s, when Anglicized styles were imposed onto the provincial German vernacular settlement, Cliveden is a Georgian country house made aware of its context by the craftsmanship of its German builders.  The Chew Family Papers also document through detailed account books which identify master carpenter Jacob Knorr and master mason John Hesser, among others, as the Germantown builders responsible for its construction.

Although not built as a plantation house, the scale of Cliveden was new to Germantown in the 1760s and is larger than most colonial houses in Philadelphia. The house is composed of two full stories with a half-story garret. Five bays organize the symmetry and rhythm of the facade, with the center bay projecting and ornamented by a pedimented Doric frontispiece with full entablature.  The pediment motif is repeated at the cornice line. Cliveden has a gabled roof, unusual for a Georgian house, again reflecting the Germantown context. The roof is pierced by two broad brick chimney stacks positioned at the roof ridge line. The roof is further adorned with five massive urns raised on brick plinths.

The walls are composed of Wissahickon schist, a less expensive option than brick and a choice that reflected the traditional building materials used in Germantown. The exterior of the house follows a hierarchy of design that includes a range of construction techniques finishes and from high style to vernacular.  The stonework at the facade is laid in regular courses of ashlar blocks accentuated by a cut stone string course and quoins with tooled mortar joints.  The public-facing west elevation is finished with scored stucco; the north and east elevation were exposed random rubble construction, though the east was later finished with stucco.  This hierarchy of finishes follows in the interior, where rooms on the east are finished with more elaborate millwork and paneling than those on the west.

The first floor plan of Cliveden is an unusual T-shaped center hall with small rooms on either side of a wide entrance hall and large chambers on either side of the perpendicular stair hall.  The front and rear halls are divided by an impressive screen of Doric columns topped with entablature.  On the second floor, a “gallery” is centered between to two large chambers on either side.  The garret was finished with chambers for servants and children, and the cellar contains a cooking hearth and more evidence of kitchen-related service spaces.  A service stair, accessing cellar to garret, is tucked into an enclosed area west of the rear hall.

Cliveden is flanked by two dependencies with temple-front facades that echo the classical features of the main house. The interior of the dependencies have more vernacular designs, with simple floor plans that reflect a typical small house of the Delaware Valley.  During the period of construction, the original 18’ square plan of the west dependency was altered to extend the building by 9’ with a large chimney to accommodate a cooking hearth and bake oven and adjacent well shaft. Opposite the Kitchen, the west dependency was a Wash House, later served as the estate office.  Both Dependencies can be considered quarters, with second floors and garrets containing sleeping chambers for service staff, enslaved and free. In 1776, Chew hired Hesser to construct a “Colonnade” or “piazza;” a covered walkway that connected the second parlor to the kitchen.  Together, the Main House, Kitchen, Colonnade and Wash House surround a work yard behind the house, an important outdoor service space.  The Direct Tax of 1798, one year after the Chews repurchased Cliveden, itemized the one story stone pantry attached to the Kitchen, a smoke house adjacent to the Wash House, and frame milk house and poultry house.  In 1814, the Wash House & office was doubled with a masonry addition to the north.  In this period, there is also a record of filling an ice house which is no longer extant.

During the first half of the 19th century, Benjamin Chew, Jr. (1758–1844) inherited Cliveden and developed it as a gentleman's farm.  There is a record of wheat fields, fencing and corn crib on the site.  After a long family conflict to settle his estate, Cliveden was inherited by Anne Sophia Penn Chew (1805–1892).  In 1868, she had the rubble-constructed Italianate North Addition built, containing two new chambers, along with technological upgrades including gas and indoor plumbing. A coal-fired central furnace and a kitchen range were also installed at this time.  The North Addition enclosed the Colonnade and added a second service stair in the rear, adapting the space into a butler's pantry.  Niece-in-Law and early preservationist Mary Johnson Brown Chew (1839–1927) next inherited Cliveden. In 1921, two bathrooms were added with modern fixtures, the one seen at the rear of the north east chamber is raised to the second floor on Colonial Revival columns.  The last generation of the Chew family and their household moved to Cliveden in 1959. Notable among repairs and changes is the beveling of floorboards throughout and the installation of a semi-custom Mid-Century Modern kitchen inside the Colonnade.

Further research 
The Chew Family Papers, containing an extensive collection of correspondence, documents, financial records and other materials, are available for research use at the Historical Society of Pennsylvania.

See also 

Historic Germantown
Stenton
Grumblethorpe
 John Johnson House
Concord School House
Wyck House
Mennonite Meetinghouse
List of National Historic Landmarks in Philadelphia
 National Register of Historic Places listings in Northwest Philadelphia

References

External links

Cliveden at USHistory.org
Cliveden National Historic Landmark Summary Listing
Cliveden (Chew House), National Historic Landmark Nomination. 2014 update.

Exterior view of Cliveden at the Library of Congress
YouTube, Growing Up at Cliveden
Benjamin Chew, Esq. A site dedicated to emerging research on Benjamin Chew, Esq.

Historic house museums in Philadelphia
Germantown, Philadelphia
American Revolutionary War museums in Pennsylvania
Biographical museums in Pennsylvania
Houses completed in 1767
Houses on the National Register of Historic Places in Philadelphia
National Historic Landmarks in Pennsylvania
Historic district contributing properties in Pennsylvania
Historic American Buildings Survey in Philadelphia
National Trust for Historic Preservation
British colonial architecture in the United States
Georgian architecture in Pennsylvania